Lloyd Oliver (April 23, 1923 – March 16, 2011) was an American veteran of the United States Marine Corps and one of the original 29 members of the Navajo Code Talkers during World War II, and the brother of fellow Code Talker Willard Varnell Oliver.

Oliver served from 1942 to 1945, eventually attaining the rank of corporal.  His parents were Howard and Olive (Lee) Oliver.

Oliver was awarded the Congressional Gold Medal.

References

1923 births
2011 deaths
Congressional Gold Medal recipients
Navajo code talkers
People from Shiprock, New Mexico
People from Avondale, Arizona
Military personnel from New Mexico
20th-century Native Americans
21st-century Native Americans